The equestrian statue of the Earl Roberts is an outdoor sculpture of Frederick Roberts, 1st Earl Roberts by Harry Bates, installed at Horse Guards Parade in London, United Kingdom.

References

External links
 
 Statue: Roberts statue at London Remembers

Cultural depictions of British men
Cultural depictions of military officers
Cultural depictions of noblemen
Equestrian statues in the United Kingdom
Monuments and memorials in London
Outdoor sculptures in London
Whitehall